Mark Quayle may refer to:
Mark Quayle (advocate, b. 1770) KC, (1770–1804), Clerk of the Rolls of the Isle of Man
Mark Quayle (advocate, b. 1804) QC, (1804–1879), Clerk of the Rolls of the Isle of Man and Member of the House of Keys
Mark Quayle (advocate, b. 1841) QC, (1841–1928), Manx-born advocate and businessman
Mark Quayle (footballer) (born 1978), association footballer